Margo McNeil (born June 22, 1948) is an American politician. She is a former member of the Missouri House of Representatives, and is currently serving on the Board of Education of the Hazelwood School District. She is a member of the Democratic party.

References

1948 births
Living people
Politicians from Cincinnati
People from St. Louis County, Missouri
Women state legislators in Missouri
Democratic Party members of the Missouri House of Representatives
21st-century American politicians
21st-century American women politicians